Eucalyptus melanophitra is a species of mallet that is endemic to a restricted area of Western Australia. It has rough, flaky grey bark on the trunk, smooth grey bark above, narrow lance-shaped adult leaves, flower buds in groups of nine or eleven, pale yellow flowers and cylindrical to barrel-shaped fruit.

Description
Eucalyptus melanophitra is a mallet that typically grows to a height of  but does not form a lignotuber. It has rough, flaky grey bark on part or all of the trunk, smooth greyish bark above. Flowering occurs between February and April and the flowers are pale yellow.

Taxonomy and naming
Eucalyptus melanophitra was first formally described in 1991 by Ian Brooker and Stephen Hopper in the journal Nuytsia from a specimen collected by Brooker in 1985. The specific epithet (melanophitra) means "black bole" or "black trunk".

Distribution and habit
This eucalypt is found on stony breakaways in small areas near the Pallinup River and the Corackerup Nature Reserve, where it grows in skeletal soils over laterite.

Conservation status
Eucalyptus melanophitra is classified as "Priority Four" by the Government of Western Australia Department of Parks and Wildlife, meaning that is rare or near threatened.

See also
List of Eucalyptus species

References

Eucalypts of Western Australia
melanophitra
Myrtales of Australia
Plants described in 1991
Taxa named by Ian Brooker
Taxa named by Stephen Hopper